Antigonus of Cumae in Asia Minor was an ancient Greek writer on agriculture, who is referred to by Pliny, Varro, and Columella, but whose age is unknown.

Notes

Ancient Greek writers
Geoponici
Writers of Magna Graecia
Ancient Greek writers known only from secondary sources